The Trafficante crime family, also known as the Tampa Mafia, is an Italian-American Mafia crime family based in Tampa, Florida. The most notable boss was Santo Trafficante, Jr. who ruled Tampa and the crime family with an iron fist. Author Scott Deitche reported that Santo Jr. was involved with the CIA to plot assassination attempts on Fidel Castro. After the death of Santo Jr. in 1987, the Tampa Mafia family has been controlled by Vincent LoScalzo.

History

Early underworld bosses in Tampa
During the early 1920s, Charlie Wall created an organized crime syndicate in Tampa, where he controlled a large number of illegal gambling rackets and corrupted many Tampa government officials through bribery. Wall controlled his organization from the Tampa neighborhood of Ybor City, and employed Italians, Cubans and men of other ethnicities in his organization. His only competitor for criminal rackets in the Tampa Bay area was Italian Mafia boss Ignacio Antinori.

Ignacio Antinori, a Sicilian-born immigrant, became a well-known drug kingpin and the Italian crime boss during the late 1920s. There was also a smaller Italian gang in the area which was controlled by Santo Trafficante Sr., who had lived in Tampa since the age of 18. Trafficante had already set up Bolita games throughout the city and was a very powerful man. Antinori took notice of Santo Trafficante and invited him into his organization and together they expanded the Bolita games across the state.

By the 1930s, Antinori and Wall were in a bloody decade-long war, which would later be known as "Era of Blood". On March 8, 1938, Wall's closest associate, Evaristo "Tito" Rubio, was shot on his porch. The war between the two continued on for years, until October 23, 1940, when Ignacio Antinori was shot and killed by a shotgun blast to the head at the Palm Garden Inn in Tampa. In 1943, Antinori's two sons Paul and Joseph were convicted in Kansas City for drug dealing and sentenced to four years in prison finally ending the decade long war. Both Wall's and Antinori's organizations were weakened, leaving Santo Trafficante as one of the last and most powerful bosses in Tampa.

Trafficante Sr. and the Cuba casinos
Santo Trafficante Sr. had now taken over organized crime activities in a majority of the city and started to teach his son Santo Trafficante Jr. how to run these operations. In Trafficante Sr.'s adult life he portrayed himself as a successful Tampa cigar factory owner. Santo was being watched closely by police and made Salvatore "Red" Italiano the acting boss.

With the Kefauver hearings and Charlie Wall testifying in 1950, both Trafficantes fled to Cuba. Trafficante Sr. had always wanted to make it big in Cuban casinos and dispatched his son, Santo, Jr., to Havana in 1946 to help operate a mob-owned casino. The Tampa mob made a considerable amount of money in Cuba, but never achieved its ambition of making the island part of its territory. After the hearings ended the Trafficantes returned to Tampa to find out that Italiano had just fled to Mexico, leaving Jimmy Lumia the biggest mobster in the city. Santo Sr. had Lumia killed after finding out he had been bad mouthing him while he was in Cuba. With Lumia eliminated Trafficante took over again.

In 1953 Santo Jr. survived a shooting. The family suspected the perpetrator was Charlie Wall and consequently, in 1955, had him killed. Trafficante remained the boss of Tampa until he died of natural causes in 1954.

Trafficante Jr. era

Santo Trafficante, Jr. was born in the United States on November 15, 1914, as one of five sons of Mafia boss Santo Trafficante. Santo Jr. succeeded his father as the boss of Tampa upon his death. Santo, Jr. never spent a day in jail, and he died of natural causes in 1987.

Despite numerous unrealized ambitions, he was regarded as one of the most powerful mob bosses of the American Mafia and ruled his family with an iron fist. During the 1950s, Trafficante Jr. maintained a narcotic trafficking network with Tommy Lucchese, the boss of the Lucchese crime family in New York City. Trafficante Jr. had known Lucchese since the 1940s, when his father and Lucchese had trained him in the mafia traditions. Trafficante Jr. would frequently meet with Lucchese in New York City for dinner.

Santo Jr. was deeply involved in the CIA efforts to involve the underworld in assassination attempts on Fidel Castro. Under pressure of a court order granting him immunity from prosecution, but threatening him with contempt if he refused to talk, Trafficante admitted to a Congressional committee in 1975 that he had in the early 1960s recruited other mobsters to assassinate Castro. "It was like World War II" he told the committee. "They told me to go to the draft board and sign up."

In 1978, Trafficante was called to testify before the United States House Select Committee on Assassinations investigating possible links between Lee Harvey Oswald and anti-Castro Cubans, including the theory that Castro had President John F. Kennedy killed in retaliation for the CIA's attempts to assassinate Castro.

Leadership under LoScalzo
In 1987, Vincent LoScalzo became boss of the Trafficante family and Florida was declared an open territory, meaning that the Five Families of New York City could operate in any city in Florida. LoScalzo controlled a much smaller family, over the years many of the older mobsters retired or died and were not replaced with new members. As the new boss LoScalzo maintained control of criminal interests in illegal gambling, prostitution, narcotics, union racketeering, hijacking and fencing stolen goods. He also controlled a few bars, lounges, restaurants, night clubs and liquor stores across Florida. Loscalzo maintained ties to Mafia families in California, New Jersey, and New York as well as being connected to the Sicilian Mafia.

On July 1, 1989, LoScalzo was indicted on racketeering charges, including grand theft. The charges were later dropped and then reinstated. LoScalzo pleaded no contest on October 7, 1997, and received three months of probation. In 1992, LoScalzo was arrested at the Tampa International Airport for carrying a loaded .38-caliber pistol in his brief case. The weapon was detected by an X-ray scanner. He was convicted in 1999, and was sentenced to 60 days in prison.

On October 26, 2000, federal authorities arrested Steven Raffa, along with eighteen members of Trafficante family's Miami faction. Raffa the leader of the family’s Miami faction committed suicide on November 16, 2000.

Current status
As of November 25, 2007, Vincent LoScalzo was in his 70's and considered a semi-retired mobster and just a "regular Joe" according to Scott Deitche, author of Cigar City Mafia. The old family membership has died and the Tampa Mob has fallen into the shadows of the New York mobs.

On August 5, 2008, the Tampa and New York FBI indicted John A. "Junior" Gotti, along with John A. Burke, James V. Cadicamo, David D'Arpino, Michael D. Finnerty and Guy T. Peden on charges of racketeering, kidnapping, conspiracy to commit murder and drug trafficking. The indictment stated that Gotti Jr. along with the other men had been involved in various criminal activities in Tampa and New York during the early 2000s. Evidence from the 2004 and 2006 trials of John Alite, Ronald J. Trucchio, and Charles Carneglia connected Gotti Jr. and others to criminal operations in Tampa, Florida.

Historical leadership

Boss

Underboss

Current members
Boss – Vincent LoScalzo – born in 1937 in Sicily. The LoScalzo family moved from Sicily to New Orleans and finally to Tampa. During the 1980s, LoScalzo increased his property holdings in West Tampa and Ybor City. He operated from Brother's Lounge on West Kennedy Boulevard and other Tampa bars. LoScalzo is still considered the "boss" of whatever is left of the Trafficante family, although it is unknown if they still have any real illegal operations.

Past members
Salvatore "Sam" Carollo –  born in Caccamo, Sicily and later grew up in Chicago to finally living in Florida. Carollo became a real estate developer in Florida and eventually owned a golf course. In 1991, Carollo was identified as a “made man” in a report from the Florida Department of Law Enforcement. In 1994, Carollo and boss Vince LoSacalzo were arrested on racketeering and fraud charges. On December 29, 2020, Carollo died of natural causes.
Ignazio Italiano – was a friend of Profaci family boss Joseph Profaci. They were from the same town of Villabate in Sicily. Ignazio was a produce salesman and the uncle to Tampa mobster Salvatore "Red" Italiano. He died on August 11, 1930.
Steven Bruno Raffa – former leader of Trafficante family's Miami faction and close associate of boss Vincent LoScalzo. Raffa took control of the family's Miami faction during the mid 1980's and operated from his base in Opa-Locka, Miami and Pembrooke Pines. During the 1990's Raffa worked with Genovese family's New Jersey faction mobster John Mamone, who began living in Pompano Beach. Raffa along with Mamone controlled a multi-million dollar money laundering operation using a network of mob owned check-cashing stores in South Florida. Raffa was arrested on October 26, 2000, along with eighteen members of his crew. He later committed suicide on November 16, 2000.
James "Jimmy" Valenti — inducted into the family during the late 1980s by boss Vincent LoScalzo. Valenti was a former protégé of capo Francis "Daddy Frank" Diecidue, and was also affiliated with soldier Louis "Lou" Caggiano. He was observed meeting with LoScalzo at his Mahalo Auto Sales shop on FBI surveillance logs from the 1990s. For 40 years, he worked at Southern Glazer's Wine and Spirits, eventually becoming the company's vice president and general sales manager before retiring in 2001. Valenti died on March 18, 2022.

Past associates
Frank Ragano – was the attorney and main advisor to Santo Trafficante Jr.

In popular culture
 Newell, Mike. Donnie Brasco (1997). A Hollywood film about former FBI agent Joseph Pistone. Val Avery played Santo Trafficante, Jr.
 Poulette, Michel. Bonanno: A Godfather's Story (1999). A made-for-television film about the rise and fall of the Bonanno crime family. The actor John Burns played the part of Mafia boss Santo Trafficante, Jr.
 Guzzo, Pete. Ghost of Ybor (2008). A made-for-television film about the life of the American gangster Charlie Wall. It shows the Trafficante crime family at the end of the film.

References

Notes

Sources
 Sifakis, Carl. Mafia Encyclopedia, Second Edition. New York: Da Capo Press, 1999. 
 Deitche, Scott. Cigar City Mafia: A Complete History of The Tampa Underworld. New York: Barricade Books, 2004. 
 Deitche, Scott. The Silent Don: The Criminal Underworld of Santo Trafficante, Jr.. New York: Barricade Books, 2008.
 Deitche, Scott. The Everything Mafia Book, Second Edition. New York: Barricade Books, 2007.
 Pistone, Joseph. Donnie Brasco: My Undercover Life in the Mafia. Joseph Pistone, 1987. 
 Davis, John. Mafia Kingfish: Carlos Marcello and the Assassination of John F. Kennedy. New York: Signet, 1989.
 Capeci, Jerry. The Complete Idiot's Guide to the Mafia, Second Edition. New York: Alpha Books, 2005.
 DeVico, Peter. The Mafia Made Easy. Peter DeVico, 2007. 
 Bliss, A.J., "MAKING A SUNBELT PLACE: TAMPA, FLORIDA," 1923–1964, Ph.D. dissertation, 2010

External links
Rick Porrello's American Mafia: Tampa, Florida by Scott Deitche
Dieland Mob: The Trafficante Family (Tampa)
American Gangland:Trafficante Crime Family

 
Italian-American crime families
Gangs in Florida
History of Tampa, Florida
Italian-American culture in Tampa, Florida